PPP or ppp may refer to:

Arts and entertainment
 Para Para Paradise, a rhythm section video game
 , a Philippine film festival
 Potter Puppet Pals, a web series created by Neil Cicierega
 ppp, a dynamic marking in music for pianississimo 
 PPPasolini, a 2015 drama based on the life of Pier Paolo Pasolini (1922–1975)
 Preston is My Paris, a multidisciplinary arts project
 PPP, the production code for the 1973 Doctor Who serial Carnival of Monsters
 "PPP" (song), a single from the album Depression Cherry by Beach House released in 2015
 JoJo's Pitter Patter Pop!, a tile matching puzzle video game

Business, economics, and law
 Purchasing power parity, a technique used to determine the relative value of different currencies
 Personal pension scheme (also known as Personal Pension Plan), a type of UK individual pension contract
 Public–private partnership, the operation of a service in the partnership of government and the private sector
 Plant Protection Product (pesticide)
 Progress, plans, problems, a reporting methodology
 Prepayment penalty, sometimes assessed when a loan is paid off ahead of schedule
 Paycheck Protection Program, a loan program for small businesses in the United States introduced during the Covid-19 pandemic

People
 Parley P. Pratt (1807–1857), an early leader of the Latter Day Saint movement, or his Autobiography, both commonly cited as "PPP"

Politics
 Pakistan Peoples Party
 Pakistan Peoples Party (Shaheed Bhutto)
 Pakistan Peoples Party (Sherpao)
 Palestinian People's Party
 People's Party of Panama
 People's Party of Punjab (India)
 People's Pioneer Party
 People's Political Power of Canada
 People's Political Party (Saint Vincent and the Grenadines)
 People Power Party (South Korea)
 People's Power Party (Malaysia)
 People's Power Party (Singapore)
 People's Power Party (Thailand)
 People's Progressive Party (disambiguation), a common name for a political party used in several countries
 Polish Underground State, the Polish Underground State during World War II
 Polska Partia Pracy, literally the "Polish Labour Party"
 Progressive People's Party (disambiguation), a common name for a political party used in several countries
 Public Policy Polling, a polling company
 Puebla-Panama Plan, an economic development and integration initiative in Mexico and Central America
 United Development Party, an Indonesian Islamic political party

Science and technology

Medicine
 Pearly penile papules, a condition that occurs on male genitalia
 Platelet-poor plasma, blood plasma with very low number of platelets
 Postpartum psychosis, a rare psychiatric condition occurring in the first two weeks after childbirth
 Preputioplasty, a plastic surgical operation on the prepuce or foreskin of the penis
 Purpura pigmentosa progressiva, better known as Schamberg disease
 Pustulosis palmaris et plantaris, a chronic recurrent pustular dermatosis

Chemistry
 Pariser–Parr–Pople method, an approximation in quantum chemistry
 Pentose phosphate pathway, a chemical process that generates five-carbon sugars
 Phosphorylation, such as 5′-ppp RNA
 Poly(p-phenylene), a conductive polymer

Computing
 Pay per play, a type of internet advertising using audio ads
 Point-to-point protocol, a communications protocol
 PowerPoint Presentation, a file created using the Microsoft Office application
 PPP (complexity), a computational complexity class
 Precise Point Positioning, a GNSS data processing technique
 Public Private Protected, in object-oriented programming
 Pony Preservation Project, a collaborative effort by 4chan's /mlp/ board to build and curate pony datasets with the aim of creating applications in artificial intelligence

Other uses 
 Congress-Bundestag Youth Exchange, a German-American exchange scholarship program
 Perfect Prom Project, a charity based in Illinois
 Point Pleasant Park, in Halifax, Nova Scotia
 Programme for People and Planet, a programme of events at Expo 2020, Dubai
 Psychology, Philosophy and Physiology, a degree course at the University of Oxford
 Whitsunday Coast Airport, south of Proserpine, Queensland, Australia (IATA code PPP)

See also 
 Triple P (disambiguation)
 PPE (disambiguation)